Meldric St. Clair Daluz Vieira (February 1, 1921 – August 2, 2011) was an Indian hockey player. He was part of the Indian hockey team that won the gold medal in 1952 Summer Olympics at Helsinki. He played in one match in the competition as a halfback.

References

External links

1921 births
2011 deaths
Field hockey players from Kolkata
Olympic field hockey players of India
Field hockey players at the 1952 Summer Olympics
Indian male field hockey players
Anglo-Indian people
Olympic gold medalists for India
Olympic medalists in field hockey
Medalists at the 1952 Summer Olympics
Indian emigrants to England
British people of Anglo-Indian descent